Julia Elbaba (born June 13, 1994) is an American former tennis player.

Elbaba has career-high WTA rankings of 372 in singles and 301 in doubles.
She made her WTA Tour main-draw debut at the 2019 Dubai Tennis Championships in the doubles draw partnering Alena Fomina.

Elbaba has one ITF singles title, won in 2012 in New Orleans.

References

External links
 
 

1994 births
Living people
American female tennis players
People from Oyster Bay (town), New York
People from Mineola, New York
Virginia Cavaliers women's tennis players
Tennis people from New York (state)